Greenwood was an Ontario provincial electoral district that existed from 1926 to 1934. It covered a section of the eastern city of Toronto east of Jones Avenue and west of Greenwood Avenue. The riding lasted less than ten years when the riding was dissolved and split between the neighbouring ridings of Riverdale to the west and Woodbine to the east.

Boundaries
In 1926 the riding was carved out of the existing riding of Riverdale with the following boundaries. The southern boundary was Lake Ontario. Going north along the west side it formed a line following Carlaw Avenue north to the city limits. The boundary went east following the city limits until it reached Greenwood Avenue. From here it went south to Queen Street East. A short jog west to Knox Avenue which was followed south to its end. This line was extended south to the lake.

Prior to the 1934 election, the riding was dissolved and split between Woodbine to the east and Riverdale to the west.

Members of Provincial Parliament

Election results

References

Notes

Citations

Former provincial electoral districts of Ontario
Provincial electoral districts of Toronto